Auguste Pelsmaeker (15 November 1899 – 19 November 1976) was a Belgian footballer. He competed in the men's tournament at the 1924 Summer Olympics.

References

External links
 

1899 births
1976 deaths
Belgian footballers
Belgium international footballers
Olympic footballers of Belgium
Footballers at the 1924 Summer Olympics
Footballers from Antwerp
Association football midfielders
K.A.A. Gent managers
Royal Antwerp F.C. managers
Beerschot A.C. players
Belgian football managers